Verbesina pseudoclausseni is a species of flowering plant in the family Asteraceae. It is only found in Brazil.

References

pseudoclausseni
Flora of Brazil
Vulnerable plants
Taxonomy articles created by Polbot